Smother is an Irish thriller drama series written by Kate O'Riordan and directed by Dathaí Keane. It stars Dervla Kirwan as Val Ahern, a mother who is determined to protect her family at any cost. The series is produced by BBC Studios and Treasure Entertainment for Raidió Teilifís Éireann, and premiered on 7 March 2021 on RTÉ One. A second series was announced in April 2021 and had its premiere on RTÉ One on 9 January 2022. It aired in the UK by Alibi in June 2021. The show then premiered on Peacock in the US on July 1, 2021. The second season premiered on April 28, 2022. The series airs in Norway on TV2. A third series began airing on 6 February 2023.

Plot
Set in a small town on the wild and rugged coast of County Clare, Val Ahern, a devoted mother, is determined to protect her family and particularly her three daughters—Jenny, Anna and Grace—at any cost. When Val's husband Denis is found dead at the foot of a cliff near their home the morning after a family party, Val attempts to investigate the events that unfolded the night before.

Cast

Main
 Dervla Kirwan as Val Ahern
 Gemma-Leah Devereux as Anna Ahern
 Seána Kerslake as Grace Ahern
 Niamh Walsh as Jenny Ahern
 Justine Mitchell as Elaine Lynch

Supporting
 Stuart Graham as Denis Ahern
 Conor Mullen as Frank Ahern
 Hilary Rose as Alanna Hutchins
 Kevin McGahern as Michael Foley
 Michael Patric as Sgt. Paudie Manning
 Thomas Levin as Carl Jensen
 Hazel Doupe as Ingrid Jensen
 Lochlann O'Mearáin as Rory Dwyer
 Éanna Hardwicke as Joe Ryan
 Brian McGonagle as Calum Dwyer
 Elijah O'Sullivan as Jacob Dwyer
 Ayoola Smart as Cathy Cregan
 Carrie Crowley as Mairead Noonan
 Dean Fagan as Finn Ahern (series 2)
 Jason O'Mara as Paul Madigan (series 3)
 Fionnula Flanagan as Caro Noonan (series 3)

Episodes

Series overview

Series 1 (2021)

Series 2 (2022)

Series 3 (2023)

Production 
Filming began in February 2020 in and around Lahinch. On the series' way of writing and storytelling, lead actress Dervla Kirwan said that "it's been a long time since anything this well written about an Irish family has come my way. In Smother, [Kate O'Riordan] has created a riveting thriller that will wake the world up to contemporary Ireland and rewrite an outdated narrative that has been peddled about the Irish for years." She also relates the series' setting to the character in the series, in particular to the Ahern family:

In March 2020, production was halted due to social restrictions being imposed nationwide to combat the spread of the COVID-19 pandemic. On the filming halt, cast member Niamh Walsh states:

On 4 April 2021, it was revealed that comedian Kevin McGahern has joined the cast in episode 5, portraying Michael Foley.

On 26 December 2021, it was announced that former Coronation Street star Dean Fagan will be starring as Denis Ahern's estranged son in the show's second series.

Awards and nominations

References

External links 
 

2020s Irish television series
2021 Irish television series debuts
Irish crime television series
Irish drama television series
RTÉ original programming
Television series by BBC Studios
Television productions postponed due to the COVID-19 pandemic
Television shows set in the Republic of Ireland